Penn State Health Children's Hospital (PSCH) is a nationally ranked women's and pediatric acute care teaching hospital located in Hershey, Pennsylvania. The hospital has 134 pediatric beds. PSCH is affiliated with the Penn State College of Medicine and is located at the Milton S. Hershey Medical Center. The hospital provides comprehensive pediatric specialties and subspecialties to infants, children, teens, and young adults aged 0–21 throughout central Pennsylvania and surrounding regions. Penn State Health Children's Hospital also sometimes treats adults that require pediatric care. PSCH also features an Commonwealth of Pennsylvania designated Level 1 Pediatric Trauma Center, 1 of 4 in the state.

It maintains the region's only Level IV (highest level), state-of-the-art neonatal intensive care unit (NICU) and Level I (highest level) pediatric trauma center.   It is staffed by 200 pediatric medical and surgical specialists.

History 
Penn State Health Children's Hospital is the sole beneficiary of charity, Four Diamonds which was started in 1972 to provide monetary support to childhood cancer patients at PSCH. Four Diamonds is the sole beneficiary of the annual Penn State IFC/Panhellenic Dance Marathon (THON) event at Penn State University's University Park campus. It is the largest student run charity in the world. Since 1977, THON has raised more than $190 million.

In October 2006, Penn State Health Children's Hospital's trauma center was one of the receiving hospitals' for victims of the West Nickel Mines School shooting in Lancaster County, Pennsylvania, treating three of the pediatric victims from the shooting.

Originally, Penn State Health Children's Hospital was housed in a five-story building opened in 2013. In Spring, 2018 Penn State began a $148 million, 126,000-square-foot vertical expansion to the building. In Fall 2020 a vertical expansion on the building was completed adding three floors and moving the Women and Babies Center, a 56-bed Level IV neonatal intensive care unit (NICU) and the state's only Small Baby Unit from the former location in the main hospital.

In July 2020, grocery store company, GIANT donated $1 million to the hospital to help support the three-floor expansion, expand the pediatric trauma and injury prevention program, and to expand the "Penn State PRO Wellness Healthy Champions program."

Awards 
The hospital was selected by insurance company Aetna as an "institute of excellence" in pediatric congenital heart surgery.

In 2008 and 2011, Penn State Hershey Children's Hospital was listed on the U.S. News & World Report as one of America's Best Children's Hospitals. For the 2013–2014 year, The Penn State Health Children's Hospital was ranked in 3 specialties including: Cancer (#42), Orthopedics (#34) and Diabetes and Endocrinology (#46).

On the 2019-20 U.S. News & World Report the hospital was ranked as #48 in pediatric cancer and #27 in pediatric cardiology and heart surgery.

The hospital was ranked nationally in five pediatric specialties and as the third best children's hospital in Pennsylvania on the 2020-21 U.S. News & World Report: Best Children's Hospitals rankings.

See also 

 Penn State College of Medicine
 Penn State Health Milton S. Hershey Medical Center

References

External links 

 

Children's hospitals in the United States
Hospital buildings completed in 2012
Penn State Milton S. Hershey Medical Center
Teaching hospitals in Pennsylvania
Pediatric trauma centers
Women's hospitals
Hospital buildings completed in 2020